Barbara Floridia (born 5 February 1977) is an Italian politician who currently serves as a Senator. She is also undersecretary of state at the Ministry of Education, University and Research in the Draghi government.

See also 

 List of current Italian senators

References 

Living people
1977 births
21st-century Italian women politicians
Senators of Legislature XVIII of Italy
Five Star Movement politicians
Women government ministers of Italy
University of Messina alumni
20th-century Italian women
Women members of the Senate of the Republic (Italy)